Songs for Swinging Lovers is the second album by The Indelicates, released on 12 April 2010. The album was recorded in Berlin in 2009 and produced by Ed East. Initially available for download "on a 'pay-what-you-like' basis", CD and special editions will follow in June 2010.

Track listing

 Europe
 Your Money
 We Love You, Tania
 Ill
 Flesh
 Savages
 Roses
 Sympathy for the Devil
 Be Afraid of Your Parents
 Jerusalem
 Anthem for Doomed Youth
 Bonus Track: I Don't Care If It's True
 Bonus Track: Savages (Acoustic Version)

Personnel

The Indelicates
Simon Indelicate – vocal, backing vocals, guitar
Julia Indelicate – vocal, backing vocals, keyboard, piano
Al Clayton – guitar, cowbell
Ed Van Beinum – drums
The Indelicates – bass

Additional musicians and production
Bastian Eppler – trumpet
Keith TOTP – tambourine, additional recording/production
Ed East – producer
Andrew Kendall – artwork

References

2010 albums